Emile Ardolino (May 9, 1943 – November 20, 1993) was an American television and film director and producer, best known for his work on the films Dirty Dancing (1987) and Sister Act (1992). He has won an Academy Award for Best Documentary Feature for his film He Makes Me Feel Like Dancin' (1983).

Early life and career
Ardolino was born in Maspeth, a neighborhood of Queens, the son of Italian immigrants Ester (nee Pesiri) and Emilio Ardolino.

He began his career as an actor in Off-Broadway productions, and then moved to the production side of the business. In 1967, he founded Compton-Ardolino Films with Gardner Compton. In the 1970s and 1980s, Ardolino worked for PBS. He profiled dancers and choreographers for their Dance in America and Live from Lincoln Center series.

Ardolino won an Academy Award for Best Documentary Feature for the 1983 film He Makes Me Feel Like Dancin'. He found commercial success with the Academy Award-winning 1987 hit Dirty Dancing.

Death
Ardolino died in California on November 20, 1993 of complications from AIDS. His last films, The Nutcracker (based on George Balanchine's New York City Ballet adaption) and the television production of Gypsy starring Bette Midler, were released and shown posthumously. Ardolino is buried beside his parents at St. John Cemetery in New York.

Personal life
Ardolino was openly gay.

Awards 
 1969 Obie Award for the Broadway production of Oh! Calcutta!
 19 Emmy Award nominations, winning three
 1983 Academy Award for Best Documentary Feature for He Makes Me Feel Like Dancin'.

Partial filmography
He Makes Me Feel Like Dancin' (1983)
Dirty Dancing (1987)
Chances Are (1989)
Three Men and a Little Lady (1990)
Sister Act (1992)
The Nutcracker (1993)
Gypsy (1993, TV movie)

References

External links 
 
Obituary: Emile Ardolino at The Independent
AllMovie

1943 births
1993 deaths
AIDS-related deaths in California
American people of Italian descent
Directors of Best Documentary Feature Academy Award winners
Film directors from New York City
American gay men
LGBT film directors
LGBT people from New York (state)
Obie Award recipients
People from Maspeth, Queens
Primetime Emmy Award winners
20th-century American LGBT people